The 2017 FC Cincinnati season was the club's second season of existence, and their second in the United Soccer League (USL). It was FC Cincinnati's first season as a second-tier team in the U.S. soccer pyramid, as the United States Soccer Federation provisionally promoted the USL from Division III to Division II for the 2017 season. FC Cincinnati plays in the Eastern Division of USL.

The season is best remembered for FC Cincinnati's championship run in the U.S. Open Cup. They won matches against five teams, including Columbus Crew and Chicago Fire of MLS (the highest division of U.S. soccer), to advance to the semifinals, a feat not achieved by a lower-division team since 2009. Their run was also noted for setting many attendance records; their matches against the New York Red Bulls and Chicago Fire were respectively the 2nd and 3rd highest-attended U.S. Open Cup matches ever, beaten only by the 2011 Final. Their match against Chicago Fire aired on ESPN, marking the first time a match from the Round of 16 received a national television broadcast.

Club

Coaching staff 

The club announced on October 21, 2016 that assistant coach Ryan Martin would not be returning for the 2017 season. On December 14, 2016, the club announced that Alan Koch, former head coach of the Whitecaps FC 2, would be taking Martin's place as an assistant coach, in addition to acting as the director of scouting and analytics.
On February 17, 2017, the club announced that head coach John Harkes was relieved of his coaching duties and replaced with Alan Koch. On March 28, 2017, Yoann Damet was added to the staff as assistant coach.

Roster 

As of December 15, 2016, FC Cincinnati has confirmed the return of seventeen players from the 2016 roster, as well as the signing of one new player. Fifteen of these players were announced on November 14, and goalkeeper Mitch Hildebrandt was announced three days later. On December 15, the return of Eric Stevenson and the new signing of Kadeem Dacres were announced. The club held a public tryout with over eighty participants on December 18, 2016. On January 6, 2017, the club announced the signings of Andy Craven, Marco Dominguez, and Aaron Walker (who was selected from the public tryout). On February 6, 2017, the club announced they acquired striker, Victor Mansaray, on loan from Seattle Sounders FC. On March 29, 2017, the club signed Justin Hoyte, a former defender for Premier League club Arsenal. On May 10, 2017, the club traded forward Andy Craven to the OKC Energy FC for forward Danni König. On May 15, 2017, the club announced the signing of defender Josu.

Where a player has not declared an international allegiance, nation is determined by place of birth.

Competitions

USL

Results Table

Standings

Statistics

Appearances

 Updated to matches played on August 1, 2017.

Goals

 Updated to matches played on August 17, 2017.

References

External links 
 

2017 USL season
American soccer clubs 2017 season
FC Cincinnati
2017